Raywood railway station is a railway station in the town of Raywood, Victoria, Australia. A station at Raywood originally opened in 1882, on what is now the Piangil line, but closed to passenger traffic on 4 October 1981, as part of the New Deal timetable for country passengers.

A new station, located north of the Inglewood Street level crossing, at the site of the former station, opened on 17 July 2022 as part of the Regional Rail Revival project.

Platforms and services
Raywood has one platform, and is served by Swan Hill line trains.

Platform 1:
 services to Southern Cross and Swan Hill

References

Regional railway stations in Victoria (Australia)
Transport in Bendigo
Railway stations closed in 1981
Railway stations in Australia opened in 2022